Danville Municipal Building is a historic city hall building located at Danville, Virginia, USA. It was built in 1926 and is a three-story, brick and concrete building faced in limestone in the Classical Revival style. Its front facade has a colonnade with Ionic order columns.

It was listed on the National Register of Historic Places in 1995. It is located in the Downtown Danville Historic District and Danville Tobacco Warehouse and Residential District.

References

City and town halls on the National Register of Historic Places in Virginia
Neoclassical architecture in Virginia
Government buildings completed in 1926
Buildings and structures in Danville, Virginia
National Register of Historic Places in Danville, Virginia
Individually listed contributing properties to historic districts on the National Register in Virginia